2, 3, 4, and 4a Precentor's Court is an historic row of three buildings in the English city of York, North Yorkshire. Grade II* listed structures, standing on Precentor's Court, the buildings date to around 1710.

Police constable William Gladin was living at number 2 in 1872, while cobbler William Bowes was at number 3.

Number 2

See also
Grade II* listed buildings in the City of York

References

Precentor's Court
Houses in North Yorkshire
1710 establishments in England
Precentor's Court 2, 3, 4, and 4a
Grade II* listed houses